This north-south road is an important transit road connecting Tehran to Fars.

Plans

Saveh
Saveh Bypass is now under construction.

Abadeh
Abadeh Bypass is now completed and operational travelling northeast of the city of Abadeh.

Abadeh-Shiraz
Saadatshahr Tunnel, located between Saadatshahr and Qaderabad, was closed for repairs and lighting related works from 22 November 2011 to mid-February 2012.

Shiraz-Firouzabad
The road is under construction to be improved to 2+2 expressway.

Firouzabad-Jam-Asaluyeh
There are plans to build another 2 lanes and make the road a 4-lane expressway.

Gallery

References

 Iran Road Maintenance & Transportation Organization
 Road management center of Iran
 Ministry of Roads & Urban Development of Iran 

65
Transportation in Isfahan Province
Transport in Tehran
Transportation in Tehran Province